Nantclwyd railway station was a station near Nantclwyd Hall, Llanelidan, Denbighshire, Wales.

The station was opened on 22 September 1864 by the Denbigh, Ruthin and Corwen Railway.

The station was host to a LMS caravan from 1934 to 1939.

The station closed to passengers on 2 February 1953, and completely on 30 April 1962.

The station was demolished in the 1970s and only the approach road exists today.

References

Further reading

Disused railway stations in Denbighshire
Railway stations in Great Britain opened in 1864
Railway stations in Great Britain closed in 1953
Former London and North Western Railway stations